Homolepis is a genus of Neotropical plants in the grass family. They are native to Mexico, Central and South America, and the West Indies.

They are annual or perennial grasses. At least one species has short rhizomes and some have stolons. They vary in form, growing erect or decumbent, the stems reaching 15 centimeters to 2 meters long. They are mostly unbranched. The leaves are linear to lance-shaped to oblong. The panicle is open or narrow with spikelets up to 1.1 centimeters long.

These grasses grow in open areas and in shade, often in moist and wet habitat.

Molecular phylogeny analysis indicates the genus is monophyletic.

 Species
 Homolepis aturensis (Kunth) Chase - Mexico, Central America, Trinidad, Colombia, Venezuela, Bolivia, Ecuador, Peru, Brazil
 Homolepis glutinosa (Sw.) Zuloaga & Soderstr. - Mexico, Central America, West Indies, Colombia, Venezuela, Ecuador incl Galápagos, Peru, Brazil, Bolivia, Paraguay, Uruguay, Argentina
 Homolepis isocalycia (G.Mey.) Chase - Brazil, Colombia, Venezuela, Suriname, Guyana, French Guiana, Panamá
 Homolepis longispicula  (Döll) Chase - Brazil (Minas Gerais, Goiás, D.F.)
 Homolepis villaricensis (Mez) Zuloaga & Soderstr. - Argentina (Misiones, Corrientes), Brazil (São Paulo, Paraná), Paraguay

References

Panicoideae
Grasses of North America
Grasses of South America
Flora of Central America
Grasses of Brazil
Grasses of Mexico
Poaceae genera
Taxa named by Carl Sigismund Kunth